Dominique Mendy (born December 1, 1983 in Dakar) is a Senegalese professional footballer who plays in the Championnat de France amateur for Olympique Noisy-le-Sec.

Career
He played on the professional level in Ligue 2 for Troyes AC and in Campeonato Brasileiro Série A for Grêmio Foot-Ball Porto Alegrense.

Personal life
Mendy also holds French citizenship.

Notes

1983 births
Living people
Footballers from Dakar
Senegalese footballers
Senegalese expatriate footballers
Ligue 2 players
ES Troyes AC players
Olympique Noisy-le-Sec players
Grêmio Foot-Ball Porto Alegrense players
Expatriate footballers in Brazil
Expatriate footballers in France
African Games gold medalists for Senegal
African Games medalists in football
Association football midfielders
Competitors at the 2015 African Games